Coy Michael Wire (born November 7, 1978) is an American television anchor and correspondent, and former professional football player in the National Football League. Since 2015, he has worked for CNN as a sports anchor and correspondent. Wire currently is the anchor of CNN 10, succeeding Carl Azuz on  September 12, 2022. 

Wire was a linebacker and safety who played college football for Stanford. He played six seasons for the Buffalo Bills from 2002 to 2007 and three years for the Atlanta Falcons from 2008 to 2010.

With CNN, Wire's many field assignments have included on-the-ground coverage of the 2015 FIFA Women's World Cup, the College Football Playoff Semi-Finals and National Championship games, and Super Bowl 50.

Early life
Wire attended Rice Elementary in the South Middleton School District. Highland Elementary School, Lemoyne Middle School, and Cedar Cliff High School, all in the West Shore School District. He graduated from Cedar Cliff in Camp Hill, Pennsylvania in 1997 where he set school records in both football and wrestling that have still not been broken. In 1995, his father, Rick, founded Dynamite Sports, a company that guides student athletes and their families through the recruiting process.

College career 
Wire graduated from Stanford University and was the first player in modern school history to lead the team in rushing one year and tackles in another.

Professional career

Buffalo Bills 
Wire was drafted in the third round of the 2002 NFL Draft (97th overall) by the Buffalo Bills. He started 15 games at strong safety as a rookie.

Following the signing of Lawyer Milloy in 2003, Wire became a full-time special teams player and was named Buffalo's Special Teams Player of the Year twice. Wire was voted a team captain in 2005 and selected by his teammates as the Bills' Walter Payton Man of the Year nominee. After suffering a neck injury in 2008 that required surgery to insert a titanium plate and four screws into his neck, Wire was released by the Bills.

Atlanta Falcons 
Wire signed with the Atlanta Falcons on July 25, 2008. He played in 47 of 48 games over three seasons with the Falcons before being released on September 2, 2011. While with the Falcons, Wire was named a team captain and selected by his teammates as the franchise recipient of the Ed Block Courage Award in 2010.

NFL statistics

Media career
Wire served as a game analyst, studio analyst and online writer for Fox Sports before joining CNN in 2015. From CNN Center, Wire anchors daily Bleacher Report segments, covers events and serves as an expert contributor across all platforms. He appears regularly on CNN programs Early Start, New Day and CNN Newsroom, in addition to HLN programs Morning Express with Robin Meade and Weekend Express with Lynn Smith. He also contributes to CNN International's World Sport program and to CNN Digital on a broad range of crossover sports stories.

In 2019, Wire worked as a special assignment travel correspondent for CNN.

On September 11, 2022, Wire was made anchor of seasonal news program CNN 10, replacing former host Carl Azuz. In the aftermath of this change, many students, teachers and parents were surprised and expressed dismay at the change of anchor.

Personal life
Wire was raised by his parents, Rick and Jane Wire. His mother, Jane, is a software analyst. He has a sister, Tiffany, and his brother, Casey, is a PGA certified teaching professional. Wire is of German, Irish, Dutch, and Japanese descent. His mother named him after the Japanese word for "love". Wire resides in Atlanta, Georgia, with his wife, Claire, who owns a home design and renovation company.

Wire wrote an inspirational book, Change Your Mind, which was published in 2012.

Community work 
Wire has served on the board of directors at Make-A-Wish Georgia and has been a keynote speaker for organizations such as the U.S. Military, UPS, and the U.S. Department of Education.

References

External links
 Stanford Cardinal bio
 WireWire.com
 On the Fringe: Wire Wire

1978 births
Living people
People from Camp Hill, Pennsylvania
American football safeties
American football linebackers
Stanford Cardinal football players
Buffalo Bills players
Atlanta Falcons players
Players of American football from Pennsylvania
American sportspeople of Japanese descent
American football running backs
Ed Block Courage Award recipients